Butchers Spur is a high ice-covered spur which descends southwestward from Mount Don Pedro Christophersen to the polar plateau. This feature on the south margin of the Queen Maud Mountains is the location of Roald Amundsen's "Butcher Shop." It was here in November 1911 that his party slaughtered their excess sledge dogs, consuming portions themselves and permitting the remaining sledge dogs a feast, prior to making the final dash to the South Pole, which was reached on December 14.

References
 

Ridges of the Ross Dependency
Amundsen Coast